Rubidimonas is a genus from the family of Saprospiraceae with one known species (Rubidimonas crustatorum).

References

Further reading 
 

Sphingobacteriia
Bacteria genera
Monotypic bacteria genera